Hans Zantema (1956) is a Dutch mathematician and computer scientist, and professor at Radboud University in Nijmegen, known for his work on termination analysis.

Biography 
Born in Goingarijp, The Netherlands, Zantema received his PhD in algebraic number theory in 1983 at the University of Amsterdam under supervision of Hendrik Lenstra Jr. for the thesis, entitled "Integer Valued Polynomials in Algebraic Number Theory."

After graduation Zantema spent a few years of employment in the industry before he switched to computer science: from 1987 to 2000 at Utrecht University and since 2000 at Eindhoven University of Technology.

Since 2007 he is a part-time full professor at Radboud University in Nijmegen. His main achievements are in term rewriting systems, in particular in automatically proving termination of term rewriting. His name is attached to 
Zantema's problem, namely does the string rewrite system 0011 -> 111000 terminate.

Selected publications 
 Zantema, Hans. 1983. Integer Valued Polynomials in Algebraic Number Theory. PhD thesis 
 Zantema, Hans. 2007 De achterkant van Sudoku. Oplossen, programmeren en ontwerpen. Aramith Hersengymnastiek.

Articles, a selection:
 Zantema, Hans. "Termination of term rewriting: interpretation and type elimination." Journal of Symbolic Computation 17.1 (1994): 23–50.
 Zantema, Hans. "Termination of term rewriting by semantic labelling." Fundamenta Informaticae 24.1 (1995): 89-105.
 Endrullis, Jörg, Johannes Waldmann, and Hans Zantema. "Matrix interpretations for proving termination of term rewriting." Journal of Automated Reasoning 40.2-3 (2008): 195–220.

References

External links
Hans Zantema's homepage at tue.nl

Dutch computer scientists
Dutch mathematicians
1956 births
Living people
Academic staff of the Eindhoven University of Technology
Academic staff of Radboud University Nijmegen
University of Groningen alumni
People from Skarsterlân
20th-century Dutch scientists
21st-century Dutch scientists